Anthony Dervin Santos Candelario (born 5 August 1992) is a Dominican footballer who plays for Chantada Club Atlético as a defender.

Early life
Born in Puerto Plata, Santos went with his parents to live in Spain aged 5. From then on, he was interested in doing football as a sport and practiced it at school.

Career

Club Lemos
Along with Adrián González, the defender joined Club Lemos of the Spanish fifth division in 2014, saying that he liked the friendliness of his teammates and the atmosphere there.

However, in early 2015, Santos was forced to return to the Dominican Republic for personal reasons, expressing effusiveness at the premature exit and stating that he thoroughly enjoyed his experience in Monforte de Lemos.

During his stint there, he was also coach of their youth categories, connecting well with the children who regretted his early departure.

Atlántico FC
Upon going back to his home country, Santos was snapped up by Liga Dominicana de Fútbol championship contenders Atlántico FC, making a solid impression in his first few games and becoming the starting left-back. The footballer also expressed surprise on the quality of football in the Dominican Republic top-level, claiming that it was better than he thought.

References

External links

Dominican Republic international footballers
Living people
1992 births
Dominican Republic footballers
Dominican Republic expatriate footballers
Dominican Republic expatriate sportspeople in Spain
Expatriate footballers in Spain
People from Puerto Plata, Dominican Republic
Association football defenders